Micropilina tangaroa is a species of monoplacophoran, a superficially limpet-like marine mollusc. It is known from a single specimen found off the coast of New Zealand.

References

Monoplacophora
Molluscs described in 1990